The following page is an alphabetical section from the list of PC games.

C

References

Lists of PC games